Self is the fourth studio album by the English group Quintessence. It was the final album by the band to feature Maha Dev and Shiva Shankar Jones as both were fired from the band by Raja Ram prior to the release of Indweller.

Track listing
Side one – At Olympic Studios 1972
 "Cosmic Surfer" – 3:48 	
 "Wonders of the Universe" – 3:27 	
 "Hari Om" (not credited on album) – 0:44
 "Vishnu Narain" – 6:26 	
 "Hallelujad" – 4:14 	
 "Celestial Procession" – 1:20
 "Self" – 3:05 	

Side two – Live at Exeter University, December 11, 1971
 "Freedom" – 6:45 	
 "Water Goddess" (includes "Gange Mai") – 14:20

CD bonus tracks
 "You Never Stay The Same" (single B-side, 1971) – 6:13
 "Sweet Jesus" (single A-side, 1971) – 2:57

Personnel
 Sambhu Babaji – bass guitar
 Maha Dev – rhythm guitar
 Shiva Shankar Jones – vocals, keyboards
 Jake Milton – drums
 Allan Mostert – lead guitar
 Raja Ram – flute, percussion

References 

1972 albums
Quintessence (English band) albums
RCA Records albums